The Saucon Rail Trail is a converted railroad track of the SEPTA Bethlehem Line that runs through Upper Saucon Township and Lower Saucon Township in Pennsylvania. The trail is 7.5 miles long and is mostly flat with few hills. It is open during all seasons. The surface of the trail is covered in gravel and crushed rock with some parts covered in pavement. The trail is popular for walking, running, and biking. The trail is also wheelchair accessible. The Saucon Rail Trail is used for organized events like 5Ks, 10Ks, and races throughout the course of the year. Dogs are allowed on the trail as long as they remain on leash.

The Saucon Rail Trail starts and ends in two different parks. One endpoint is located in Water Street Park in Hellertown. The other endpoint is located in Southern Lehigh Living Memorial Park in Upper Saucon Township. The endpoints of the trail both have parking available with close access to the trail. There are also eight total access points for getting onto the Saucon Rail Trail with only a select few that have parking lots. The trail passes through the Upper Saucon Township Community Park.

The Saucon Rail Trail features a variety of geological formations and wildlife. Portions of the trail are shaded by trees and other portions run along fields. Geological formations line some of the edges on the trail. The Saucon Rail Trail also has bridges that go over streams of water. Some points of interest along the trail include a refurbished railroad sign, Reading Drive Meadow, Allentown Formation Rock Outcrop, Landis Mill Road Rock Formations, and Water Street Park Boulders.

History 
The Saucon Rail Trail was originally part of the North Pennsylvania Railroad. The railroad used to serve the four municipalities (Lower Saucon Township, Hellertown, Upper Saucon Township, and Coopersburg) that the trail currently runs through today. The railroad supported local industries such as anthracite coal, farming, commuter transportation, iron ore, mail services, dry goods/groceries and grains.

The railroad began construction on July 2, 1855 in Philadelphia, Pa. On July 26, 1981 SEPTA commuter lines were terminated to Bethlehem after 124 years of service. Then, in 1984 the last train was run. In 2008 SEPTA issued a $2 million dollar contract to remove the rails and ties from the railroad. The first phase of the rail trail opened in 2011 between Hellertown and Upper Saucon Township.

Future projects 
Future projects for the Saucon Rail Trail includes building a bridge over the Preston Lane gap. Clearing work and the removal of brush along the unused railbed have already begun. The next phase of the Saucon Rail Trail is an extension of three extra miles of trail into Bucks County as the Upper Bucks Rail Trail. Construction for the extended trail is scheduled to begin in Summer 2020. The trail will be connected from the southern endpoint to existing trails and sidewalks towards Quakertown.

References 

Trails
Rail trails in Pennsylvania